Tell Me When to Whoa is an EP by Bowling for Soup released in June 1998, and later re-released in 1999, on the local Denton music label FFROE. The album is currently out of print. The band released digitally remastered versions of Bowling for Soup, Cell Mates, and Tell Me When to Whoa through iTunes and Amazon.com in October 2011. It is the last studio recording by the band to feature Lance Morrill on drums.

Production and recording
In a August 24, 1998 band newsletter, it was announced that the band would again work with Jeff Roe recording in Denton, Texas and record at Reel Time Audio and release a new album titled "Tell Me When To Whoa" through FFROE Records.
This would be the last album to feature drummer Lance Morrill who in January 1998 got married and by mid 1999 decided to move on with life and would soon quit the band. In July 1999 Morrill would soon be replaced by Gary Wiseman.
The EP was reissued in July 1999 and included one new song on the CD, "The Bitch Song" which was receiving radio play around the country.

Tracks

Personnel
Bowling for Soup
 Chris Burney — guitar, backing vocals
 Erik Chandler — bass, backing vocals
 Lance Morrill — drums, backing vocals
 Jaret Reddick — lead vocals, guitar

References

External links

Tell Me When to Whoa at YouTube (streamed copy where licensed)

1998 debut EPs
Bowling for Soup albums